Newcastle Academy is a mixed secondary school located in Newcastle-under-Lyme in the English county of Staffordshire.

Previously known as Sneyd High School, it was later renamed Newcastle Community High School and then gained Science College status. In October 2015 the school converted to academy status and was renamed Newcastle Academy. The school is now part of Multi-academy trust The United Endeavour Trust along with Clayton Hall Academy and Sir Thomas Boughey High School.

Newcastle Academy offers GCSEs and BTECs as programmes of study for pupils, with some courses offered in conjunction with Clayton Hall Academy.

References

External links
Newcastle Academy official website

Secondary schools in Staffordshire
Newcastle-under-Lyme
Academies in Staffordshire